James Frank McElwain (born March 1, 1962) is an American football coach. He is the head football coach at Central Michigan University, a position he has held since 2019. McElwain served as the head football coach at the University of Florida from 2015 to 2017, and Colorado State University from 2012 to 2014, where he was named the Mountain West Conference Coach of the Year in 2014. He was the offensive coordinator at the University of Alabama from 2008 to 2011.

Early life
McElwain was born in Missoula, Montana in 1962. He played quarterback at Sentinel High School in Missoula where he was chosen as an all-state quarterback. He then went on to play quarterback in college at Eastern Washington from 1980 to 1983, and he earned a degree in education.

Coaching career

Early career
After graduating from Eastern Washington, McElwain stayed there as a graduate assistant and was eventually given the job of quarterbacks and receivers coach. During his stint as a coach there from 1985 to 1994 his team made its way to the NCAA Division I-AA playoffs twice and won the Big Sky championship in 1992 under head coach Dick Zornes. From Eastern Washington, McElwain took an offensive coordinator position at Montana State. He enjoyed a successful career with the Bobcats from 1995 to 1999, and coached the offense to the number one scoring offense in the Big Sky Conference in 1998 with 31.6 points per game.

McElwain's first coaching job in Division I-A football was at University of Louisville where he was the receivers and special teams coach from 2000 to 2002. At Louisville, he tutored All-Conference USA receivers Arnold Jackson, Deion Branch, Damien Dorsey and Zek Parker. Also his special teams set a school record of nine blocked kicks in 2000–2001 season. He was then offered the assistant head coaching position at Michigan State when he followed Louisville's head coach John L. Smith there. With the Spartans his coaching of the receivers and special teams helped lead them to the Alamo Bowl in his first season.

Oakland Raiders
McElwain's coaching stint in the National Football League was brief. After his success at Michigan State, he was offered a job to be the quarterback coach for the Oakland Raiders. He was with them for one year in which the Oakland Raiders ended the season 2–14.   When head coach Art Shell was dismissed following the season, so were several of the assistant coaches, including McElwain.

Return to college football: Fresno State
In 2007, McElwain accepted a job to become the offensive coordinator at California State University, Fresno (Fresno State). With the Fresno State Bulldogs, he built a powerhouse offense which ranked 38th in the country averaging 419.5 yards a game and 32nd in the nation in points per game with 32.9. He helped lead the 2007 Fresno State team to a 9–4 record on the year including a win over Georgia Tech in the Humanitarian Bowl.

University of Alabama
On February 1, 2008, McElwain accepted an offer from Nick Saban to be the offensive coordinator at the University of Alabama. In his first season as the offensive coordinator, the Crimson Tide finished the regular season 12–0, before falling to the University of Florida in the 2008 SEC Championship Game and the University of Utah in the 2009 Sugar Bowl.

In 2009, McElwain's offense helped lead the Crimson Tide to a 12–0 regular season record. The team went on to defeat the top-ranked team in the country, the Florida Gators, in the 2009 SEC Championship Game. There his offense dominated the Gators' number one defense in the country and compiled 490 yards of offense, more than twice the yards the Gators defense had averaged giving up all year. McElwain's offense outrushed the Gators' offense 251 yards to 88 yards, 63 of those yards coming from the 2007 Heisman winner Tim Tebow. His offense put up 32 points and held on to the ball for 39 minutes and 37 seconds, almost twice the Gators total of 20 minutes and 23 seconds. Alabama went on to beat the Texas Longhorns in the 2010 BCS National Championship Game. In 2011, the Crimson Tide finished the season with a 12–1 record, and beat the LSU Tigers 21–0 in the 2012 BCS National Championship Game.

Colorado State
On December 12, 2011, sources revealed that McElwain had accepted the head coaching position with Colorado State. A press conference was held at the Colorado State University Rams indoor practice facility on December 13, 2011 to officially announce the hiring.

McElwain's tenure, dubbed by the school's athletic department as "A Bold New Era", began on a high note. McElwain's Rams rallied from an 11-point deficit to defeat arch-rival Colorado 22–17 at Sports Authority Field in Denver on September 1. McElwain became the first CSU coach to win his debut since Jerry Wampfler in 1970 and the first ever to win his debut against Colorado. The momentum did not last long though as CSU suffered a 22–7 setback in their home opener one week later to defending FCS National Champion North Dakota State, the start of a six-game losing skid. The program showed improvement towards the end of the season, winning three of their final five games to finish 4–8 in McElwain's first season.

McElwain's second season with CSU was much more successful. CSU began the season losing their first two games, both of which they had led in the 4th quarter. However, CSU finished the season winning 8 of its next 12 games. McElwain finished his second season with a record of 8–6 after CSU's miraculous comeback win in the New Mexico Bowl.

McElwain's third season with CSU led to even greater accomplishments. After a Week 2 loss at Boise State, the Rams reeled off 9 straight wins, climbing as high as #21 in the national rankings, and being in the conversation for a possible New Year's Day bowl bid. Those hopes were dashed, however, in their final regular season game at Air Force, when the Falcons hit a game-winning field goal as time expired, finishing CSU's regular season at 10–2. Notwithstanding this loss, the Rams were noted for a powerful offense throughout the year. Colorado State averaged 498 yards per game (13th best in the nation), while boasting the nation's second most efficient quarterback in Garrett Grayson and the top receiver by yards per game (149.1) and touchdowns (17) in Rashard Higgins. Under McElwain, the Rams were one of only two "Group of 5" teams with victories in 2014 over two Power 5 conference teams, defeating both Colorado and Boston College.

As a result of the successful transformation of the program, McElwain was named the Mountain West Conference's coach of the year on December 2, 2014.

University of Florida
McElwain was hired as head coach of the University of Florida Gators in December 2014 by athletics director Jeremy Foley.

The Gators won in McElwain's debut on September 5, 2015 against New Mexico State by a score of 61–13. The Gators' regular season record under McElwain was 10–2, which included a 38–10 upset against No. 3 Ole Miss that moved the Gators to #11 the following week. After the suspension of quarterback Will Grier, the Gators lost to LSU 35-28. McElwain led the Gators to their first SEC Eastern Division championship since 2009 with a 9–7 win over Vanderbilt, becoming the first coach to win an SEC Eastern Division championship in his first year. After clinching the SEC Eastern Division championship, the Gators suffered consecutive blowout losses to Florida State, Alabama, and Michigan by a combined score of 97-22.

McElwain was named the 2015 SEC Coach of the Year in his first season as the head coach of Florida.

McElwain won a second consecutive Eastern Division title in 2016. However, that season saw a second-half collapse against Tennessee and blowout losses to Arkansas, Florida State, and Alabama.

McElwain became the target of online ridicule in 2017 when a photo of a man who looks similar to him, naked and in a compromising position with a shark on a boat, surfaced on the internet. McElwain denied the allegations that he was the man in the photo, who was subsequently identified as a retired New York City police officer.

During an October 23 press conference, McElwain alluded to death threats against himself and his players. Later that day, Florida officials revealed that McElwain offered "no additional details" about those threats. According to ESPN, this led school officials to seriously consider firing McElwain for cause.

On October 28, 2017, the Gators played the rival Georgia Bulldogs. Before the game there were rumors that Florida officials were considering firing McElwain for cause, though Athletic Director Scott Stricklin stated there were no such discussions. Florida lost to Georgia 42–7. The next day (October 29), McElwain met with Stricklin and other university officials. At that meeting, school officials told McElwain that they intended to fire him for cause, and contended that they did not owe him a buyout because he failed to tell them about the alleged death threats. Ultimately, Florida and McElwain mutually agreed to part ways, effective immediately. Defensive coordinator Randy Shannon served as interim coach for the remainder of the season.

According to a post-mortem by ESPN's Mark Schlabach and Edward Aschoff, relations between McElwain and the administration had been rather strained from the time McElwain arrived on campus. The relationship became even chillier when McElwain frequently criticized the state of the program and the administration's commitment to him. School officials interviewed by ESPN said that McElwain had been "an odd fit" for Florida from the start, and didn't seem to understand "being part of a team." Reportedly, his comments about the supposed threats made it apparent that "this was not going to work." His 34-game tenure in Gainesville was the shortest for a non-interim coach in more than 80 years.

McElwain was also criticized for on-field results that came up well short of what Florida fans had come to expect. He had been hired not just to win games, but to fix an offense that had become among the weakest in the country under his predecessor, Will Muschamp. In Muschamp's final season, the Gators were 96th in the country in total offense. In McElwain's two-plus seasons, the Gators actually regressed, finishing 111th, 116th, and 112th (at the time of his firing). His teams only scored 30 or more points seven times in two-plus years. Defense and recruiting were also poor by Florida standards.

University of Michigan
On February 20, 2018, McElwain was named the wide receivers coach for the Michigan Wolverines. On December 2, 2018 it was announced he would be leaving Michigan to become the next head coach at Central Michigan University.

Central Michigan University
McElwain was announced as the 29th head football coach of the Central Michigan Chippewas on December 2, 2018. McElwain took over a CMU program that had gone 1-11 in 2018 with no wins against FBS opponents. In his first season with the Chippewas, McElwain led the team to an 8-4 record, and an appearance in the Mid American Conference championship game against the Miami Redhawks at Ford Field in Detroit where they would lose 26-21.

McElwain was named the Mid American Conference Coach of the Year on December 4, 2019 and on December 9, Central Michigan accepted an invitation to play in the New Mexico Bowl against the San Diego State Aztecs in which CMU would lose by a score of 41-11.

A few days after the end of the 2019 season, McElwain announced he would return to Central Michigan for the 2020 season.   In 2020, the Chippewas played a conference-only schedule due to the ongoing COVID-19 pandemic.  CMU finished with a 3-3 record, including a win over rival Eastern Michigan.

McElwain and Central Michigan would finish the 2021 season with a 9-4 record. They finished as co-champions of the MAC West division, but would lose the tie breaker to Northern Illinois, who defeated the Chippewas 39-38 earlier in the season. Central Michigan would go on to defeat Washington State in the Sun Bowl by a score of 24-21.

Personal life
Jim McElwain is married to Karen McElwain, and has two daughters, Johanna and Elizabeth, and one son, Jerrett.

McElwain was radio personality Colin Cowherd's roommate in college at Eastern Washington.

When the McElwains sold their home in Gainesville, Florida, they took a loss of roughly $400,000, which led to media jokes about McElwain taking another loss at Florida. However, this transaction was ultimately a favor to another family. A previous owner of their home had designed it to be accessible to wheelchair users, and the McElwains had converted an eight-car garage into a guest wing. The purchasers, medical equipment company CEO Rick Staab and his wife Michelle, have three children, with the oldest being a wheelchair user due to dystonia, and the second-oldest less seriously affected by the same condition. The Staabs were looking for a larger home, and Rick remembered attending a fundraiser at the McElwain house and realized that it would meet his family's unique needs. The Staabs planned to turn the converted garage, which included a wheelchair lift into the main house, into an apartment for their oldest child, and felt that the home could be a long-term home for the dystonia charity they had founded more than a decade earlier. Before the McElwains had even listed their home, Rick contacted their real estate agent and made an offer. The McElwains initially considered it a lowball offer, but once they learned that it came from the Staabs, they began discussing a sale, and closed on the transaction in early 2018.

The McElwains' living arrangements at Jim's current post at Central Michigan are unique; they live in a barn a few miles from campus. Shortly after McElwain was hired, he attended a party at the home of the athletic director that was attended by many of the program's biggest donors, among them Chuck McGuirk, the namesake of CMU's basketball arena. When McGuirk asked the McElwains where they planned to live, they told him that they would like to live in a barn. Unknown to the McElwains at the time, McGuirk had purchased a farm a few miles from campus several years earlier that included a 6,000-square-foot barn, and he had thought about building living quarters on the lower level. The McElwains envisioned the barn as a meeting space for large groups in addition to a living space. When they visited the barn, they were sold on its potential, and McGuirk spearheaded the conversion of the barn into a combined home and meeting space.

Head coaching record

* Did not coach bowl game

**McElwain was fired by Florida prior to the Missouri game. Defensive coordinator Randy Shannon served as interim coach for the remainder of the season.

References

External links
 Central Michigan profile
 Florida profile

1962 births
Living people
American football quarterbacks
Alabama Crimson Tide football coaches
Central Michigan Chippewas football coaches
Colorado State Rams football coaches
Eastern Washington Eagles football coaches
Eastern Washington Eagles football players
Florida Gators football coaches
Fresno State Bulldogs football coaches
Louisville Cardinals football coaches
Michigan State Spartans football coaches
Michigan Wolverines football coaches
Montana State Bobcats football coaches
Oakland Raiders coaches
Sportspeople from Missoula, Montana
Coaches of American football from Montana
Players of American football from Montana